Stephanie Risdal Nielsen (born 16 August 1991 in Copenhagen as Stephanie Nielsen) is a Danish female curler.

Teams

References

External links

Video: 

Living people
1991 births
Sportspeople from Copenhagen
Danish female curlers
Danish curling champions